The São Francisco Xavier Environmental Protection Area is an environmental protection area in the state of São Paulo, Brazil.

Location

The São Francisco Xavier Environmental Protection Area (APA) is in the municipality of São José dos Campos, São Paulo.
The municipality is a key destination for regional tourism, with its waterfalls characteristic of the Mantiqueira Mountains ecosystems.

The area holds one of the few remnants of broad leaf rainforest in the state.
The Serra dos Poncianos feeds the watersheds of the Peixe and Fartura rivers, the largest sources for the Jaguari Dam.
There are several waterfalls, and trails for hiking and mountain biking.
Ecotourism while preserving biodiversity is seen as the most promising local economic activity.

History

The São Francisco Xavier Environmental Protection Area was created by SP state law 11.262 of 8 November 2002, and is regulated by law SMS 64/2008, which instituted its management plan.
It is mainly concerned with protecting water resources and the southern muriqui, a primate.
It is managed by the Fundação Florestal of SP, with support from the prefecture of São José dos Campos.
It is part of the Mantiqueira Mosaic of conservation units, established in 2006.

Notes

Sources

Environmental protection areas of Brazil
Protected areas of São Paulo (state)
2002 establishments in Brazil